Sudamérica Rugby Sevens, previously known as the CONSUR Sevens, is an annual rugby sevens tournament organized by Sudamérica Rugby. It was contested since 2006, and became a multi-tournament circuit starting with the 2017 incarnation.

Results by year

CONSUR era

Sudamérica era

Results by team

Summary of team placings up to and including 2018:

References

External links
 Sevens page

Rugby sevens competitions in South America
2006 establishments in South America